Dr. Caroline M. McGill (1879–1959) was a co-founder of the Museum of the Rockies in Bozeman, Montana, the first pathologist for the state of Montana and the first successful female doctor in Butte, Montana.

Early life
Caroline M. McGill was born on a farm in Mansfield, Ohio and was one of five children. Her father was a farmer and music teacher and her mother was a midwife. Although later living on a hardscrabble farm on the Missouri Ozarks, Caroline's parents were strong supporters of higher education for all their children and Caroline received her Teaching Certificate from Lebanon Normal School in 1901. She used this certificate and teaching knowledge to support herself as an instructor at University of Missouri Medical School teaching pathology 1901 through 1909 while working on her Bachelors, Masters and Ph.D. degrees.

Awards
In 1909, McGill graduated Phi Beta Kappa with a Ph.D. in Anatomy and Physiology.

In 1909, Caroline was honored as the first recipient of the Sarah Berliner Research Fellowship, an endowment that paid for a year of study in Europe, with the opportunity to meet and study with authoritative persons in her field of Zoological science. Caroline studied at University of Berlin in Germany, University of Tübingen in Germany, and Naples Zoological Station in Italy.

In 1955, McGill was awarded an honorary doctorate by Montana State College for her “accomplishments in the medical field and in historic and wilderness preservation.” The Butte Business and Professional Women’s Club awarded McGill as “Woman of the Year” in 1955.

Publications
 The Effect of Low Temperatures on Hydra. McGill, Caroline. Biological Bulletin, 01/1908, Volume 14, Issue 2, pp. 78–88
 The structure of smooth muscle in the resting and in the contracted condition. McGill, Caroline. American Journal of Anatomy, 1909, Volume 9, Issue 1, pp. 493–562 
 The early histogenesis of striated muscle in the esophagus of the pig and the dogfish. McGill, Caroline. The Anatomical Record, 01/1910, Volume 4, Issue 1, pp. 23–47
 The effect of contraction on the volume of the smooth muscle nucleus. McGill, Caroline. The Anatomical Record, 12/1909, Volume 3, Issue 12, pp. 633–635
 The chromosomes of anasa tristis and anax junius. Lefevre, George and McGill, Caroline. American Journal of Anatomy, 02/1908, Volume 7, Issue 4, pp. 469–487
 Blood Urea Determinations in 211 Cases. Schwartz, Harold and McGill, Caroline. Archives of Internal Medicine, 01/1916, Volume XVII, Issue 1, p. 42
 Abstracts. Corson, Eugene R; McGill, Caroline; Kirk, Edwin G; Coghill, G. E; Pohlman, A. G; Retzer, Robert. The Anatomical Record, 07/1908, Volume 2, Issue 4, pp. 143–156

Dr. McGill
While traveling in Europe on the Sarah Berliner Fellowship, she was asked to come to Montana to become a pathologist there; after returning from her studies in Europe, Caroline moved to Butte, Montana to become the state's first pathologist (1911–13), working extensively as an advocate for tuberculosis patient and community health initiatives.

Dr. McGill’s pathology efforts related to Butte miners and the Butte community's ongoing battle with tuberculosis  prompted her to work with Montana's antituberculosis organizations; the Montana Tuberculosis Association and an organizer of the Butte Anit-Tuberculosis Society.
McGill was also an outdoor recreationalist. Not only did she treat the miners of Butte, but she also hunted and enjoyed outdoor life with them. In her diary, she wrote, “never was any older woman more differently or more kindly treated...the relaxation of this outdoor life made it possible for me to carry on my heavy practice in Butte.”

Later years

After retiring from her medical practice in 1956, she started working with Dr. Merrill G. Burlingame in 1957, donating to the people of Montana the remarkable gift of her large collection of artifacts, collectible antiques, her personal and professional papers, and her time to catalog all the materials; the two became co-founders of the Museum of the Rockies.

References

External links 
 Caroline McGill MSU Special Collections: Birth and death dates from this external source

1879 births
1959 deaths
Physicians from Ohio
People from Butte, Montana
University of Missouri alumni
American women physicians
Johns Hopkins School of Medicine alumni